Kay Wingberg (born 1949) is a German mathematician at the University of Heidelberg. His research interests include algebraic number theory, Iwasawa theory, arithmetic geometry and the structure of profinite (or pro-p) groups.

Publications 
 with Jürgen Neukirch and Alexander Schmidt Cohomology of number fields. Springer 2000, second edition 2008,

References

External links

faculty page, University of Heidelberg

1949 births
Living people
20th-century German mathematicians
Academic staff of Heidelberg University
21st-century German mathematicians